Edward Waters University is a private Christian historically Black university in Jacksonville, Florida. It was founded in 1866 by members of the African Methodist Episcopal Church (AME Church) as a school to educate freedmen and their children. It was the first independent institution of higher education and the first historically black college in the State of Florida. It continues to be affiliated with the AME Church and is a member of the Independent Colleges and Universities of Florida.

History
The AME Church was the first independent black denomination in the United States and was founded in 1816 in Philadelphia, Pennsylvania. After the Civil War, it sent numerous missionaries to the South to plant AME churches. The first African Methodist Episcopal pastor in the state, William G. Steward, originally named the college Brown Theological Institute. L Charles H. Pearce was also involved in establishing an educational institution for the AME church in Jacksonville.

Struggling with some financial difficulties, the school closed for much of the 1870s. It reopened in 1883 as "East Florida Conference High School”, then changed to “East Florida Scientific and Divinity High School.” Over the next ten years, the curriculum was expanded. In 1892, the school was renamed for Edward Waters, the third bishop of the AME Church.

A drawing of 1893 shows that the College President at that time was John R. Scott, Sr., first pastor of the St. Paul African Methodist Episcopal Church of Jacksonville, and a former member of the Florida Legislature.

The original Edward Waters University campus was destroyed by the Great Fire of 1901. By 1904 the college obtained new land and work was started on the new facility. Edward Waters was accredited as a junior college in 1955 under President William B. Stewart and five years later had a restored four-year curriculum. Beginning in 1979 the school was accredited as a four-year institution by the Commission on Colleges of the Southern Association of Colleges and Schools (SACS) and started awarding bachelor's degrees.

Academics
Edward Waters University offers bachelor's degrees in eight academic programs including the following: Bachelor of Arts in communications, Music, Psychology, or Criminal Justice; Bachelor of Science in biology, Elementary Education or Mathematics; and Bachelor of Business Administration.

Accreditation
Beginning in 1979, Edward Waters University (EWU) was accredited as a four-year institution by the Commission on Colleges of the Southern Association of Colleges and Schools (SACS-COC) and was recently fully reaffirmed in 2015.

In 2004, Edward Waters University had submitted documents to SACS to support their request for reaccreditation. A Florida Times-Union investigation in October discovered that the EWU documents plagiarized sections of text and statistics from a similar Alabama A&M University document. The Commission on Colleges voted to drop EWU from membership in SACS, thus revoking the school's accreditation, but the school appealed. A hearing was held in Atlanta during February 2005, and the appeal by Edward Waters University was denied.

The school filed a lawsuit seeking an injunction during litigation, which a federal judge granted. The judge ruled that the college could show they were denied due process, and appointed two mediators. In June, the college and SACS agreed to a settlement that allowed the school to remain accredited while re-filing their accreditation documentation. The university's accreditation was reaffirmed in 2006.

Campus

Historic facilities

Centennial Hall

Centennial Hall, which contains the Obi-Scott-Umunna Collection of African Art, is the oldest building on campus. Built in 1916, it was added to the United States National Register of Historic Places on May 4, 1976. It was designed by Richard Lewis Brown, Jacksonville's first known black architect.

The Centennial Hall building contains the Edward Waters University Library which, was relocated from the H. Y. Tookes Building in 1979. The library also contains art and artifacts from central and West Africa.

Administration
Dr. Jimmy Jenkins, served as president from 1997 to 2005 and was credited with increasing enrollment and raising standards at the school. 
Dr. Oswald P. Bronson, former president of Bethune-Cookman College, served as interim president while a presidential search committee took two years to select a new leader. 
Dr. Claudette Williams became the first female president of Edward Waters in 2007. She resigned in February 2010 to assume a position as a vice president with the accreditation organization, Southern Association of Colleges and Schools. 
Nat Glover became EWC's 29th president on February 12, 2011. He retired in May 2018. 
Dr. A. Zachary Faison, Jr. is the 30th President of Edward Waters College and took office in July 2018.

Athletics
The Edward Waters athletic teams are called the Tigers and the Lady Tigers. The university is a member of the NCAA Division II ranks, primarily competing in the Southern Intercollegiate Athletic Conference (SIAC) as a provisional member since the 2021–22 academic year; which they were a member on a previous stint from 1930–31 to 1934–35.

Prior joining the NCAA, The Tigers previously competed in the Gulf Coast Athletic Conference (GCAC) of the National Association of Intercollegiate Athletics (NAIA) from 2010–11 to 2020–21 (with an associate transitional membership period for competing in conference championships during the 2021–22 school year); and in the Sun Conference (formerly known as the Florida Sun Conference (FSC) until after the 2007–08 school year) from 2006–07 to 2009–10. For football only, Edward Waters participated in The Sun Conference for the 2014 and 2015 fall seasons, and would later join the Mid-South Conference's Sun Division from the 2017 to 2020 fall seasons.

Edward Waters competes in 16 intercollegiate varsity sports: baseball, basketball, cross country, football, track & field (indoor and outdoor) and volleyball; while women's sports include basketball, cross country, golf, soccer, softball, track & field (indoor and outdoor) and volleyball; and co-ed sports include competitive cheerleading.

Move to NCAA Division II
In 2019, the university received a membership invitation to join the SIAC, a historic HBCU athletic conference playing at the NCAA Division II level. Although still holding active membership in the NAIA, EWU has a scheduling agreement with the SIAC to play SIAC opponents in non-conference competition. Following the invitation, the college plans to apply for NCAA Division II membership and begin the multi-year transition process to become a full postseason-eligible member of the NCAA and the SIAC.

The university broke ground on a permanent on-campus football facility in February 2020. The team previously played at local high schools. The new facility is planned to meet NCAA specifications as part of the athletic development process associated with the move to Division II.

Marching band
Edward Waters' marching band is officially known as the "Triple Threat Marching Band."  The band was established in 2001 and has twice received an invitation to the Honda Battle of the Bands in 2009 and 2013.  The marching band has also been invited to perform at halftime for the NFL's Jacksonville Jaguars.

Notable people
Dock J. Jordan - Former President of Edward Waters College and Kittrell College, lawyer, civil rights leader 
Leonard F. Morse - Alumnus of the Theology Department, Former President of Edward Waters College, Founder of Phi Beta Sigma Fraternity, Incorporated.
Reggie Brown - Jacksonville City Council Representative
Jim "Cannonball" Butler - former NFL running back
Samuel Charles - Professional American football wide receiver
Nat Glover - former president of Edward Waters and former Sheriff of Jacksonville
Betty Holzendorf - former Florida State Representative from Jacksonville
Frederick Douglas Harper - author and scholar
Buck O'Neil - former Negro league baseball player
Rahman Johnson - TV personality, actor and former Duval County Commissioner
A. Philip Randolph - Civil rights activist and founder of the Brotherhood of Sleeping Car Porters

See also

Independent Colleges and Universities of Florida

References

Further reading

External links
 
 Official athletics website
 Duval County listings at National Register of Historic Places
 www.flheritage.com Florida's Office of Cultural and Historical Programs
 Duval County listings
 Centennial Hall at Edward Waters College

 
African Methodist Episcopal Church
Buildings and structures in Jacksonville, Florida
Historically black universities and colleges in the United States
History of Jacksonville, Florida
National Register of Historic Places in Jacksonville, Florida
Universities and colleges affiliated with the African Methodist Episcopal Church
Universities and colleges in Jacksonville, Florida
Educational institutions established in 1866
Universities and colleges accredited by the Southern Association of Colleges and Schools
Westside, Jacksonville
Universities and colleges in the Jacksonville metropolitan area
Liberal arts colleges in Florida
1866 establishments in Florida
Private universities and colleges in Florida